Trickem is an unincorporated community in Cleburne County, Alabama, United States.

History
The community's name is derived from Tri-Com, which is a shortened form of Tri-Communities Church, which was another name for the local Mt. Giliard Church. The post office operated from 1891 to 1903.

Notes

Unincorporated communities in Cleburne County, Alabama
Unincorporated communities in Alabama